Rajan Batta is an American operations research scientist, currently a SUNY Distinguished Professor at University at Buffalo. Batta earned his doctorate in Operations Research in 1984 from Massachusetts Institute of Technology and is a member of University at Buffalo faculty beginning in 1984. He also has had several administrative appointments, including Chair of the Department of Industrial and Systems Engineering, Interim Dean, and Associate Dean in various capacities of the School of Engineering and Applied Sciences (SEAS) at the University at Buffalo (UB).  Currently he serves in the role of Associate Dean for Faculty Affairs and Diversity.

Education 
Batta received his undergraduate degree with honors (BTech) in Mechanical engineering from the Indian Institute of Technology (IIT) Delhi, India in 1980 and his PhD degree in Operations Research in 1984 from the Department of Electrical Engineering and Computer Science Massachusetts Institute of Technology, Cambridge, Massachusetts, USA.

Research
Batta is a published author in various fields of operations research, applied operations research, military operations research, facility location, and transportation.

As an author
Batta has a total of 154 journal publications, including 8 in Operations Research; 3 in Management Science; 11 in Transportation Science; 2 in Interfaces, 21 in European Journal of Operational Research, 20 in Computers and Operations Research, 5 in IISE Transactions, 12 in Socio-Economic Planning Sciences, and 9 in Military Operations Research. Batta was listed in the top 50 "most productive and influential authors" in an article commemorating the 40th year of publication of European Journal of Operational Research (EJOR). He has published a total of 21 papers in EJOR during the journal's first 40 years. His most cited paper in EJOR is "Review of recent developments in OR/MS research in disaster operations management" published in 2013.  It is co-authored with his former PhD student Gina Galindo, who is now a faculty member at the university of del Norte, Baranquilla, Colombia.  This paper has a total of 680 citations according to Google Scholar.

Research and Leadership Awards
 Fellow, Institute for Operations Research and the Management Sciences, 2022 
 Frank and Lillian Gilbreth Industrial Engineering Award, Institute of Industrial and Systems Engineers, 2022 
 Best paper award from the journal Military Operations Research, 2020 
 Koopman Prize for outstanding publication in military operations research by the Military and Security Society, INFORMS, 2018.
 Award for Technical Innovation in Industrial Engineering, Institute of Industrial and Systems Engineers, 2016.
 Albert G. Holzman Distinguished Educator Award, Institute of Industrial Engineers, 2015 
 Best paper award for the journal IIE Transactions: Design and Manufacturing, 2013 
 AIIMS-MOPTA Optimization Modeling Competition Winner, Lehigh University, 2012 
 Dr. David F. Baker Distinguished Research Award, Institute of Industrial Engineers, 2008 
 SUNY Research Foundation Award for Research and Scholarship, 2007 
 Fellow, Institute of Industrial Engineers, 2006
 Best paper award from the journal Military Operations Research, 2005 
 Sustained Achievement Award, Exceptional Scholar Program, University at Buffalo, 2002

Teaching Awards

 University at Buffalo Excellence in Graduate Student Mentoring Award, 2014-2015 
 SUNY Chancellor's Award for Excellence in Teaching, 2007

References

External links
 

Living people
State University of New York faculty
21st-century American engineers
MIT School of Engineering alumni
Year of birth missing (living people)
University at Buffalo faculty